Ricardo Lopes may refer to:

 Ricardo Lopes (footballer, born 1968), Portuguese football winger
 Ricardo Lopes (footballer, born 1990), Brazilian football winger